Zherong County (Foochow Romanized: Ciá-ìng-gâing) is a county in the northeast of Fujian province, People's Republic of China, bordering Zhejiang province to the north. It is under the administration of the prefecture-level city of Ningde.

Administrative divisions
Towns:
Shuangcheng, Fuxi

Townships:
Chengjiao Township, Zhayang Township, Dongyuan Township, Zhaizhong Township, Huangbai Township, Chuping Township, Yingshan Township

Climate

References

County-level divisions of Fujian
Ningde